Topaginella  is a genus of minute fossil sea snails, marine gastropod mollusks or micromollusks in the family Cystiscidae. Like all of the related genera, this genus is sometimes still classified in the family Marginellidae.

This genus is extinct.

Shell description 
Shell minute, pyriform, strongly narrowed anteriorly; spire low; lip thickened, strongly denticulate; external varix probably absent (needs to be confirmed); distinct axial costae present; siphonal notch absent; columella multiplicate, with combined total of usually 8 plications plus parietal lirae.

Type species
The type species of the genus Topaginella is
Marginella octoplicata Tenison Woods, 1877 †; OD (M)

Remarks: The type species seems to be unique (a monotypic genus). The multiplicate columella and lack of a siphonal notch place it near Cystiscus, but the pyriform shape, exserted spire, denticulate lip, and fine axial costae render it distinct.

Fossil record 
This genus is known from the Miocene of Australia.

References

Cystiscidae
Prehistoric mollusc genera
Gastropod genera
Miocene gastropods
Prehistoric invertebrates of Oceania